The Prix Romy Schneider (Romy Schneider Award) is awarded annually to a young and upcoming actress working in the French film industry.

It  is named after the actress Romy Schneider (1938–1982). The prize is awarded by a jury each year in Paris in conjunction with its male counterpart, the Prix Patrick Dewaere (until 2006 the Prix Jean Gabin).

Recipients
In 1994, the German actress Sandra Speichert was the first non-French – and so far the only German – recipient. The youngest recipient was Vanessa Paradis (17 years old in 1990), the oldest Marie-Josée Croze (40 years old in 2010).

References

External links
 
 

French film awards
Awards established in 1984
Romy Schneider